Joshua Mqabuko Nkomo Polytechnic is a state higher education institution in Gwanda, Zimbabwe, offering Diploma in Education.

The Government of Zimbabwe plans major investment into the polytechnic, which will allow it to start offering degrees and resolve the accommodation shortage for students.

The planned Gwanda State University shall be hosted by the Polytechnic whilst construction takes place.

References

Universities and colleges in Zimbabwe
Gwanda
Buildings and structures in Matabeleland South Province
Education in Matabeleland South Province